Henrietta Dubrey (born 1966) is a painter currently living in West Penwith, Cornwall. She studied at the Wimbledon School of Art, graduating in 1989.

Dubrey has an interest in calligraphy and gesture-making, in common with Penwith artists of the 50s and 60s. She has been selected eight times for the Royal Academy of Arts Summer Show, most recently in 2003.

In 2011 and 2012 some of her pictures were featured on the sets of the BBC television series Absolutely Fabulous.

Her work has been exhibited at the Edgar Modern Gallery, Bath, and the Belgrave Gallery, St Ives. In March 2017 she took part in an exhibition of "groundbreaking" woman artists, at the Sarah Wiseman Gallery in Oxford, to mark International Women's Day.

References

External links
 Henrietta Dubrey's home page.

1966 births
Living people
20th-century British painters
21st-century British painters
Abstract expressionist artists
Alumni of Wimbledon College of Arts
St Ives artists
British women painters
20th-century British women artists
21st-century British women artists